Events from the year 1468 in Ireland.

Incumbent
Lord: Edward IV

Events
 Events of this year are recorded in A Fragment of Irish Annals. The text is believed to date from the years 1467-68 or immediately after and covers only these two years.

Births

Deaths
 Thomas FitzGerald, 7th Earl of Desmond, died by execution.
 Torna Ó Maolconaire, Ollamh Síol Muireadaigh

References

 
1460s in Ireland
Years of the 15th century in Ireland